The Young People's Party is a political party in Sierra Leone without parliamentary representation.

References

External links 
Official website 

Political parties in Sierra Leone